Marlena Spieler (born 16 April 1949) is a food writer of more than 70 cookbooks. She formerly contributed for Bon Appétit, Saveur and the San Francisco Chronicle food column "The Roving Feast."

Early life
Spieler was born in Sacramento, California. As a student, she started drawing recipes while she attended an art school. Her life interest was focused on cooking, tasting, and sharing stories about food.

Career
Spieler's publications is based on cooking, eating and sharing. As a food writer, she was the former Roving Feast columnist for The San Francisco Chronicle. She also  works for radio and T.V. shows. She has written over 70 cookbooks. Spieler's book, "The Classic Barbecue and Grill Cookbook was a #1 best-seller in the UK. After writing "Yummy Potatoes," she was invited as an ambassador to the 2008 UN Year of Potato conference in Peru.

Awards and recognitions
Spieler received the James Beard for two book and one newspaper column, the Guild of Food Writers Awards twice (UK best radio food broadcaster of the year), and the Association of Food Journalists (USA:Best Column in Newspaper of Over 400,000 circulation) twice, for radio presenting and publications. Her book "Feeding Friends" won the International Cookbook Award in Perigueux, France in 2000, and the "Jewish Heritage Cooking" book was honored in the Loire Valley in 2003, by a Special Jury Award at World Gourmand Book Awards.

Family
Spieler currently resides in Britain with her husband Alan.

Selected publications
 1997 The Vegetarian Bistro: 250 Authentic French Regional Recipes
 2002 Williams-Sonoma Collection: Vegetable
 2002 The Jewish Heritage Cookbook
 2003 Classic Home Cooking by Marlena Spieler, Mary Frances Berry
 2004 Jewish Cooking
 2004 Grilled Cheese: 50 Recipes to Make You Melt by Marlena Spieler, Sheri Giblin
 2005 Macaroni & Cheese by Marlena Spieler, Noel Barnhurst
 2006 The Complete Guide to Traditional Jewish Cooking
 2007 Yummy Potatoes: 65 Downright Delicious Recipes by Marlena Spieler, Sheri Giblin (Photographs)
 2008 Mexico by Marlena Spieler, Marita Adair (Contributor), Nick Rider

References

External links
Marlena Spieler's official website
Marlena Spieler's YouTube
Marlena Spieler's Twitter
Marlena Spieler's Facebook

1949 births
Living people
American food writers
British food writers 
Writers from Sacramento, California
James Beard Foundation Award winners
Bon Appétit people